Zengeza East is a constituency of the National Assembly of the Parliament of Zimbabwe. It covers part of Harare, the capital of Zimbabwe. Its current MP since the 2018 election is Goodrich Chimbaira of the Movement for Democratic Change Alliance.

Electoral history 
In 2008, Collen Gwiyo was elected the MP for Zengeza East, defeating Arthur Mutambara (the head of a rival faction of the MDC who remerged his faction with Tsvangirai's after the first round of the presidential election), ZANU-PF candidate Patrick Nyaruwata, and UPP candidate Simba Maxwell.

References 

Harare
Parliamentary constituencies in Zimbabwe